Robert Browne (born 3 July 1863, date of death unknown) was a Barbadian cricketer. He played in two first-class matches for the Barbados cricket team in 1883/84 and 1896/97.

See also
 List of Barbadian representative cricketers

References

External links
 

1863 births
Year of death missing
Barbadian cricketers
Barbados cricketers
People from Christ Church, Barbados